Third Party is a collaborative studio album by American hip hop production duo Blue Sky Black Death and singer Alexander Chen. It was released by Fake Four Inc. in 2010.

Critical reception
Rick Anderson of AllMusic gave the album 3.5 stars out of 5, saying, "The songs are desultory but strangely attractive; the singing is cold and lackluster, but oddly comforting." He added: "The overall sound is something like '80s synth pop with the turntable set at too low a speed, and it's weird and dreamy and pretty and just slightly annoying all at the same time." Trav Glave of URB said, "the vocals do a nice job of painting more sound and layering it all together."

Track listing

References

External links
 

2010 albums
Collaborative albums
Blue Sky Black Death albums
Fake Four Inc. albums